This is a list of people (real or fictional) appearing on the cover of Rolling Stone magazine in the 1980s. This list is for the regular biweekly issues of the magazine, including variant covers, and does not include special issues. Issue numbers that include a slash (XXX/YYY) are combined double issues.

1980

1981

1982

1983

1984

1985

1986

1987

1988

1989

References

Sources
 Rolling Stone Coverwall 1967-2013
 Rolling Stone: 1,000 Covers: A History of the Most Influential Magazine in Pop Culture, New York, NY: Abrams, 2006. 

Lists of actors
Lists of entertainers
Lists of musicians
1980s